The Ocna de Fier mine is a large open pit mine in the western of Romania in Caraș-Severin County, 25 km west of Reșița and 511 km north-west of the capital, Bucharest. Ocna de Fier represents the largest iron ore reserves in Romania having estimated reserves of 200 million tonnes of ore grading 25% iron metal. The mine produces around 10,000 tonnes of iron ore/year.

References 

Iron mines in Romania